Taps is a 2006 short film.  The film was screened at the 2006 Rhode Island Film Festival.  It was directed by Vincent Versace and starred Ben Kurland, Karim Muasher, Ina Marie Smith, and Vincent Versace. A surprise at the festival, the film won first prize in the best short category.

Plot
The draft has been reinstated, and on the night before being shipped off to war, Robbie and his friends share one last night together.  The only problem is, that the big secret his best friend Jon and his ex-girlfriend Jen have been keeping from him is revealed by their other friend, Moose.  With only hours remaining, they must resolve their differences before Robbie leaves them, what may be for good.

Cast
 Ben Kurland - Jon
 Karim Muasher - Moose
 Ina Marie Smith - Jen
 Vincent Versace - Robbie
 Holly Adams - Maria
 George Sapio - Wayne
 Wyeth Uhler - Young Jon
 Eli Bolton - Young Moose
 Troy Uhler - Young Robbie
 Joseph Versace - TV Debater (voice)

Awards and nominations
Won - First Prize, Best Short Film, 2006 Rhode Island Film Festival
Nominated - Best Screenplay, 2006 Rhode Island Film Festival

External links

Rhode Island International Film Festival Awards

2006 films
2006 short films
2006 drama films
2000s English-language films
American drama short films
2000s American films